Manicina is a genus of reef-building stony corals in the family Mussidae.

Species
The following species are included in the genus according to the World Register of Marine Species:

 Manicina areolata (Linnaeus, 1758)
 †Manicina grandis (Duncan, 1864)
 †Manicina navicula (Duncan, 1864)

References

Faviinae
Scleractinia genera
Taxa named by Christian Gottfried Ehrenberg